The Relative Gain Array (RGA) is a classical widely-used method for determining the best input-output pairings for multivariable process control systems. It has many practical open-loop and closed-loop control applications and is relevant to analyzing many fundamental steady-state closed-loop system properties such as stability and robustness.

Definition
Given a linear time-invariant (LTI) system represented by a nonsingular matrix , the relative gain array (RGA) is defined as 

where  is the elementwise Hadamard product of the two matrices, and the transpose operator (no conjugate) is necessary even for complex . Each  element  gives a scale invariant (unit-invariant) measure of the dependence of output  on input .

Properties
The following are some of the linear-algebra properties of the RGA:

 Each row and column of  sums to 1.
 Lastly, .

Generalizations
However, it has been shown that the Moore–Penrose pseudoinverse fails to preserve the critical scale-invariance property of the RGA (#2 above) and that the unit-consistent (UC) generalized inverse must therefore be used.

References

Arrays